Satna Assembly constituency is one of the 230 Vidhan Sabha (Legislative Assembly) constituencies of Madhya Pradesh state in central India.

Members of Legislative Assembly
 1957: Shivanand, INC
 1962: Sukhendra Singh, JS
 1967: K. Parekh, INC
 1972: Kanta, INC
 1977: Arun Singh, INC
 1980: Lalta Prasad Khare, INC(I)
 1985: Lalta Prasad Khare, INC
 1990:	Vrijendra Pathak, BJP
 1993: Brinjendra Pathak, BJP
 1998: Saeed Ahemad, INC
 2003: Shankar Lal Tiwari, BJP
 2008: Shankar Lal Tiwari, BJP
 2013: Shankar Lal Tiwari, BJP
 2018: Siddharth Sukhlal khushwaha, INC

It is part of Satna District.

See also
Satna

References

Assembly constituencies of Madhya Pradesh